The Charles LeMoyne Hospital is the major hospital in Longueuil, Quebec, Canada. It is located on Taschereau Boulevard in the borough of Greenfield Park opposite the borough of Saint-Hubert and in close proximity to the LeMoyne neighbourhood in the borough of Le Vieux-Longueuil. It also serves neighbouring cities on the south shore of Montreal. A teaching hospital affiliated with Université de Sherbrooke, the hospital is used to train students in medical school, nursing and other multidisciplinary programs.

The Charles LeMoyne Hospital is home to 3,000 employees, of which 1,500 are nurses, 500 are healthcare professionals and technicians, 325 are practicing doctors and specialists as well as 180 volunteers. It has an annual budget of over $200 million. It currently has 571 beds.

It is also the home to the Montérégie Comprehensive Cancer Care Centre which was recently constructed. This was the first phase of a planned 3-phase hospital expansion project.

References

External links
Santé Montérégie
Charles LeMoyne Hospital Foundation

Hospital buildings completed in 1966
Buildings and structures in Longueuil
Hospitals in Quebec
Hospitals established in 1966
Université de Sherbrooke
1966 establishments in Quebec